Dong Bang is a tambon (subdistrict) of Bueng Khong Long District, in Bueng Kan Province, Thailand. In 2020 it had a total population of 6,575 people.

Administration

Central administration
The tambon is subdivided into 11 administrative villages (muban).

Local administration
The whole area of the subdistrict is covered by the subdistrict administrative organization (SAO) Dong Bang (องค์การบริหารส่วนตำบลดงบัง).

References

External links
Thaitambon.com on Dong Bang

Tambon of Bueng Kan province
Populated places in Bueng Kan province
Bueng Khong Long District